WKYO (1360 AM) is a radio station licensed to Caro, Michigan broadcasting a full-service classic country format. In addition to its classic country format the station features a strong commitment to local news and information from around Caro and Tuscola County. WKYO was the only station in its region that played a 1960s based oldies format since the Tri-Cities' WHNN evolved to a more classic hits direction, although Owosso's WOAP "The Big 1080" can be heard in parts of WKYO's listening area. Prior to the oldies format, WKYO carried a long-running country format.

In addition to Oldies, WKYO is a heritage full-service station which airs Farm Programming from MFRN; local news, ABC Radio News, Daily Obituary Reports, Detroit Tigers baseball, and the Trading Post, a longtime station feature airing weekdays at 11am where listeners can buy/trade and sell items. The station also is affiliated with Detroit Red Wings hockey and Red Eye Radio.

On November 1, 2017, WKYO changed their format from oldies to classic country, branded as "Classic Country WKYO". (info taken from stationintel.com)

Previous logo

References
Michiguide.com - WKYO History

External links
Edwards Group Radio
Classic Country 1360 Facebook

KYO
Classic country radio stations in the United States
Radio stations established in 1967